KROQ LA Invasion was an annual autumn rock festival organized by KROQ radio.

It began under the name "KROQ Inland Invasion" with a retro theme focus and was held at the Hyundai Pavilion in Devore, California, from 2001 to 2006. In 2007, it was renamed "KROQ LA Invasion" and moved to the Home Depot Center in Carson, California. The last festival was in 2007.

Line-ups
Bands listed in reverse order of night's performance.

References

Rock festivals in the United States
Music festivals in Los Angeles
KROQ-FM